= Raghnailt =

Raghnailt is a Norse-Gaelic female given name.

== People ==
- Raghnailt ingen Amhlaibh, Princess of Isle of Man, fl. 12th century.
- Raghnailt Ní Conchobair, Princess of Connacht and Ireland, died 1211.
- Raghnailt Ní Fhergail, died 1255.
- Raghnailt Bean Uí Madadháin, died 1268.
- Raghnailt Ní Raghallaigh, died 1325.
- Raghnailt Ní Bradaigh, died 1381.
- Raghnailt Níc Aodha Uí Choncobhair, died 1393.
- Raghnailt Ní Birn, died 1417.
- Raghnailt Dubh Ní Briain, died 1421.
- Raghnailt Ní Anligi, died 1473.
- Raghnailt Níc Con Mara, died 1486.
- Raghnailt Ní Con Mara, Queen of Thomnd, fl. c. 1500.
